Araban in Iran may refer to:

Araban, Gilan
Araban, Dorud,  Lorestan Province
Araban, Khorramabad, Lorestan Province